The Jakarta–Cikampek Toll Road or Japek toll road is an expressway that was inaugurated in 1988. The highway links Jakarta with cities to its east in the province of West Java, in Indonesia.

History
Jakarta–Cikampek Toll Road was inaugurated in 1988, linking Jakarta, Bekasi, Bekasi Regency, Karawang Regency and Purwakarta Regency.

Since 2005, this toll road also connects Bandung and Jakarta via the separate Cipularang Toll Road; the interchange to Bandung was built before the Dawuan exit.  This toll road is also part of AH2. The toll road is operated by PT Jasa Marga Tbk. In June 2015, Cikopo–Palimanan Toll Road was opened, which means Jakarta and Cirebon are now connected via toll road. An elevated toll road is built to reduce congestion of this toll road.

After the closure of Cikarang Utama Toll Gate in 23 May 2019, the central toll gate is relocated to Cikampek Utama (to/from Cirebon-Semarang-bound) and Kalihurip Utama (to/from Purwakarta–Cileunyi Toll Road-bound).

Exits and Gates

Rest area
Rest area In Jakarta–Cikampek

Road Information 
Jakarta–Cikampek Toll Road is nominated as the most congested highway in Indonesia, especially in the area of Cikunir JCT- Bekasi Barat (although half of the expressway is 8-lanes dual carriageway (KM0-KM37) and another half is 6 lanes (KM37-KM73). By the completion of Jakarta-Cikampek Elevated Tollway spanning  from Cikunir to West Karawang, the capacity is expanded and congestion is slightly decreasing along this stretch (another stretch after Karawang Barat eastbound is, unfortunately, more congested.)

As of 2021, Jakarta-Cikampek toll road is surrounded  by 2 main projects which is under construction : LRT Cawang-Bekasi Timur (north section, KM0-KM18, under construction) and Jakarta-Bandung High Speed Railway (south section, KM0-KM38).

The lane management along this expressway are provided in this table.

Jakarta–Cikampek Toll Road is implementing full open-toll system after the demolition of Cikarang Utama Toll Gate (where the west part is open-toll while the rest is closed-toll). The toll fare for this expressway is shown in this table starting from January 17, 2020.

External links
 Indonesia. Direktorat Jenderal Bina Marga. & Arge Intertraffic-Lenzconsult.  1975 Jakarta-West Java Tollway System feasibility study. Part B, Jakarta-Cikampek Highway Arge Intertraffic-Lenzconsult, Germany
 Jasamarga Indonesia Highway Corp: Rest Area

References

Buildings and structures in Jakarta
Toll roads in Indonesia
Transport in Jakarta
Transport in West Java